Vasily Semyonovich Sadovnikov ( – ) was a Russian painter, and a leading Russian master of perspective painting.

Biography 
Vasily Semenovich Sadovnikov was born in 1800 in Saint Petersburg into the family of a serf belonging to Princess N. P. Golitsyna. He obtained his freedom in 1838, after her death, when he was already a well-known artist.

Vasily's brother, Pyotr Sadovnikov, was the architect of the Stroganov and Golitsyn families. He started his professional training with Andrey Voronikhin, subsequently became a Member of Saint Petersburg Academy of Arts (1849). Vasily Sadovnikov also learned his craft in Voronikhin's studios, where he came in contact with the painters Maxim Vorobiev and Alexey Venetsianov, who not only helped the gifted youth professionally but also took an active part in his liberation. Sadovnikov mainly painted "views" (vedute), but these views are always inhabited with vivid scenes, which characterize the artist not only as a landscapist but also as a genre master.

His views of St. Petersburg and its suburbs from 1830 to 1850 and interiors of its palaces, commissioned by the royal court and other high patrons, are best known. Sadovnikov's Panorama of Nevsky Prospect (1830–1850), which was 16 meters long, was later etched and widely published.

He died in 1879 in Saint Petersburg and was buried at Mitrofanyevskoe Cemetery (now abolished).

See also 
Vasily Tropinin, another painter who was born a serf.
Andrey Voronikhin, an architect who was a serf.

References

Sources

External links 
 Sadovnikov, Olga's Gallery

19th-century painters from the Russian Empire
Russian male painters
1800 births
1879 deaths
19th-century male artists from the Russian Empire